Ján Poničan (pseudonym Ján Rob Poničan) (June 15, 1902, Očová – February 25, 1978, Bratislava) was a Slovak poet, novelist, lawyer, playwright and translator.

Biography 

Poničan was born in to a peasant family, his parents died when he was a child and Ján was raised by his relatives. He received his education in a Hungarian classical grammar school in Banská Bystrica and received his diploma in Lučenec. He later continued at the Technical University in Prague, but after two years he transferred to law, which he graduated from in 1927.

In 1924 he joined the Communist Party of Czechoslovakia and became a member of the Davisti, a group of left-wing intellectuals and was among the founders of the DAV magazine.

Poničan began to work in Bratislava as a trainee lawyer and gave lectures on the Soviet Union. He was the head of the International Red Aid delegation and visited Moscow and Siberia. After his return to Banská Bystrica he was convicted and imprisoned for illegal Communist activities.

The following year he was a practicing lawyer with Vladimír Clementis and a year later he opened his own law firm and represented mainly workers and communists. He practiced law until 1947, later he was secretary of the Bar Association, a public and state notary.

After 1945, he was the secretary and vice-president of the Association of Slovak Writers from 1958 to 1959, the head of the Hungarian editorial office of the Slovak Publishing House of Fine Literature, and later, until 1964, when he retired, he was the director of this publishing house.

Works 
In his poems he expressed his political opinions, revolutionary and proletarian enthusiasms, but also his personal restlessness, erotic and affective motives, impressions from urban environments and also social issues. He used the melody of images, the poetic search for rhymes. In addition to poetry, prose and theater, he translated playwrights of foreign literatures, such as the Russians Sergei Yesenin and Vladimir Mayakovsky, Hungarians Endre Ady and Sándor Petőfi, and also works of Bulgarian literature.

Poetry 

 1923 – Som, myslím, cítim a vidím, milujem všetko, len temno nenávidím 1929 – Demontáž 
 1932 – Večerné svetlá 
 1934 – Angara
 1937 – Póly 
 1941 – Divný Janko 
 1942 – Sen na medzi
 1946 – Ivan Klas
 1946 – Povstanie 
 1947 – Mesto
 1949 – Na tepne čias
 1954 – Básne 
 1958 – Riava neutícha
 1962 – Ohne nad riekou
 1967 – Držím sa zeme, drží ma zem 
 1972 – Špirála ľúbosť 
 1973 – Hĺbky a diaľky

Prose 

 1935 – Stroje sa pohli
 1945 – Sám
 1945 – Pavučina 
 1945 – Hôrny kvet
 1946 – Treba žiť 
 1949 – Z čias-nečias 
 1959 – Po horách-dolinách
 1960 – A svet sa hýbe 
 1964 – Červená sedma 
 1973 – Jánošíkovci 
 1975 – Búrlivá mladosť
 1979 – Dobyvateľ

Drama 

 1924 – Dva svety 
 1935 – Iskry bez ohňa
 1936 – Bačov žart
 1936 – Vzbura na rozkaz 
 1941 – Jánošík
 1944 – Básnik a kráľ 
 1945 – Vzbura žien
 1949 – Čistá hra
 1958 – Štyria 
 1962 – Všetkostroj
 Máje

Children's literature 

 1953 – Deti, deti, pozrite 
 1979 – Skaza hradu

References 

1902 births
1978 deaths
20th-century Slovak writers
Slovak male writers
Slovak dramatists and playwrights
Communist Party of Slovakia (1939) politicians
Communist Party of Czechoslovakia members
Czechoslovak Comintern people
Slovak translators
Czechoslovak lawyers
Slovak communists
Slovak children's writers
Slovak anti-fascists